Gastrotheca pseustes is a species of frog in the family Hemiphractidae.
It is endemic to Ecuador.
Its natural habitats are subtropical or tropical moist montane forests, subtropical or tropical high-altitude shrubland, subtropical or tropical high-altitude grassland, rivers, freshwater marshes, intermittent freshwater marshes, pastureland, and heavily degraded former forest.
It is threatened by habitat loss.

References

Gastrotheca
Amphibians of Ecuador
Amphibians of the Andes
Taxonomy articles created by Polbot
Amphibians described in 1987